The Washington State Cougars college football team competes as part of the NCAA Division I Football Bowl Subdivision (FBS), representing Washington State University in the North Division of the Pac-12 Conference (Pac-12). Since the establishment of the team in 1888, Washington State has appeared in 18 bowl games. Included in these games are four appearances in the Rose Bowl Game and one Bowl Championship Series (BCS) game appearances, in the 2003 Rose Bowl.

Key

Bowl games

Notes

References
General

Specific

Lists of college bowl games by team

Washington (state) sports-related lists